Neil Horsfield (born 7 December 1966) is a Welsh former athlete who competed mainly in the 800 metres and 1500 metres. He won a silver medal in the 1500m at the 1985 European Junior Championships, before going on to represent Wales at two Commonwealth Games and Great Britain at the 1990 European Championships.

Horsfield won the 1990 AAA Championships 1500m title and twice won the UK Championship 1500m title (1987, 1990). His Mile run best of 3:54.39 (1986) still stands as Welsh record. His 1500m best of 3:35.08 (1990) stood as the Welsh record for more than 30 years, before Jake Heyward broke it in June 2021 with a time of 3:33.99.

International competitions

References

1966 births
Welsh male middle-distance runners
Living people
Athletes (track and field) at the 1986 Commonwealth Games
Athletes (track and field) at the 1990 Commonwealth Games
Commonwealth Games competitors for Wales